Friends is a 1999 Indian Malayalam-language buddy comedy-drama film written and directed by Siddique, produced by Lal and starring  Jayaram, Mukesh, and Sreenivasan with Meena, Divya Unni, Jagathy Sreekumar, V. K. Sreeraman, Janardhanan and Cochin Haneefa in supporting roles. It was the highest-grossing Malayalam film of the year, grossing around 11 crore at the box office against a budget of  2 crore. It was later remade into Tamil with the same name (2001) and into Telugu as Snehamante Idera (2001) and Odia as Dosti.

Plot

Friends Aravindan, Chandu and Joey value friendship over everything else, even family, and for this reason, Chandu resists the advances of Aravindan's sister Uma. When the trio take up a painter's job at a mansion, Aravindan falls in love with Padmini, who lives there and Padmini's jealous cousin makes him believe that his overtures are reciprocated. When the truth is revealed and Padmini rejects him outright, Chandu stands up for his friend and speaks ill of her. This makes her swear to separate the friends. Her actions and their consequences forms the rest of the plot.

Cast

 Jayaram as Aravindan Menon
 Mukesh as Captain Chandu
 Sreenivasan as Chackachamparambil Joey
 Meena as Padmini, Aravindan's wife
 Divya Unni as Uma Menon, Aravindan's sister
 Jagathi Sreekumar as Chackachamparambil Lasar
 V. K. Sreeraman as Justice Poonkulathu Shankara Menon, Aravindan's father
 Kavitha as Aravindan's mother
 Janardhanan as Madhava Varma
 Cochin Haneefa as Manager Sundareshan, a guide of Madhava Varma
 Shilpa as Abhirami, Padmini's cousin
 T. P. Madhavan as Poonkulathu Damodhara Menon, Sankara Menon's elder brother
 Sukumari as Damodhara Menon's wife
 Zeenath as Lalitha, Madhava Varma's wife
 T. R. Omana as Madhava Varma's mother
 Machan Varghese as Kunjappan
 Mani C. Kappan as Cyriac
 Joju George
 Kollam Ajith as Goonda
 Vaishnav Balachandran as Chandu, Aravindan's son
 Lal as himself in the song "Pularikkinnam"

Soundtrack 
The film's soundtrack contains six songs, all composed by Ilaiyaraaja and lyrics by Kaithapram Damodaran Namboothiri.

Box office
The film was the highest grossing Malayalam movie of 1999 and collected 11 crore at the box office against a budget of  2 crore.

References

External links
 

1999 films
1990s Malayalam-language films
1990s buddy films
1999 comedy-drama films
Films directed by Siddique
Indian buddy comedy-drama films
Malayalam films remade in other languages
Films shot in Kochi
Films scored by Ilaiyaraaja